Brian Kann (21 July 1933 – 21 May 2019) was an Australian rules footballer who played with Hawthorn in the Victorian Football League (VFL).

Kann, who went to Melbourne High School, started out in the Hawthorn Colts. He played senior football at Hawthorn for six seasons, from 1954 to 1959. A defender, Kann was part of Hawthorn's historic 1957 side, which qualified for the VFL finals for the first time in the club's history. He played in Hawthorn's semi final win over Carlton and preliminary final loss to Melbourne. Over the next two years, Kann made only seven league appearances, but did captain the Hawthorn reserves to the 1958 and 1959 premierships.

In 1960, Kann was captain-coach of Moorabbin, which finished the regular season in sixth position, to make the Victorian Football Association finals. They were eliminated from the finals by Yarraville, at the quarter-final stage.

Also a district cricketer, Kann played for the Fitzroy Cricket Club and in his youth represented the Victorian Schoolboys. He was a member of Fitzroy's 1953/54 premiership side.

In 1995, his son Julien Kann was initiator and founder of the Munich Kangaroos in Germany, as well as founding member of the Australian Football League Germany in 1999.

References

1933 births
2019 deaths
Australian rules footballers from Victoria (Australia)
Hawthorn Football Club players
Moorabbin Football Club players
Moorabbin Football Club coaches
Fitzroy cricketers